Loch Howie is a small, narrow, upland freshwater loch on the north side of Blackcraig Hill, approximately  west of Dumfries, Scotland. The loch was surveyed on 23 July 1903 by James Murray as part of Sir John Murray's Bathymetrical Survey of Fresh-Water Lochs of Scotland 1897-1909.

The loch is popular for fishing and is populated with perch, pike and roach.

References 

Howie
Howie